Kaal is Sanskrit word and Hindu deity.

Kaal may also refer to:

Kaal (2005 film), a 2005 Bollywood film
Kaal (2007 film), a 2007 Tollywood film directed by Bappaditya Bandopadhyay
KAAL (TV), an ABC television affiliate in Minnesota, U.S.
Kaal, the fictional planet to which Jeng Droga fled after the Battle of Endor in the Star Wars Expanded Universe
Aira Kaal (1911–1988), Estonian writer
Anu Kaal (born 1940), Estonian opera singer

Estonian-language surnames